Akil DeFreitas (born 7 November 1986) is a Trinidadian footballer who currently plays for Iceland fourth-tier outfit Kormákur/Hvöt.

Career

Club

Early career
DeFreitas graduated from St. Anthony's College in 2006. He then went to the University of North Florida, scoring 7 goals and 3 assists in 17 games, tying for the team lead in goals in 2007. During that season, he was named to the Atlantic Sun Conference All-Freshman Team and the Second Conference All-Star Team, as well as being named conference Freshman of the Year. In 2008, he played 18 games, scoring 6 goals and 2 assists for Florida and was named to the Atlantic Sun Conference All-Star Team. In 2009, he was transferred to North Carolina State University and played in 20 games, scoring 2 goals and being named Atlantic Coast Conference Player of the Week multiple times.

Capital City F.C.
On 12 May 2011 it was announced that DeFreitas had signed to his first professional contract with Canadian Soccer League side Capital City F.C. in their inaugural season. Akil quickly became a mainstay on the wing for the Ottawa club, and was an integral part of the club's excellent first season. Over the course of the season, he developed great chemistry with teammate and club scoring leader Sullivan Silva, and contributed 10 goals and 5 assists in 23 games. This stellar performance earned him the CSL Rookie of the Year award. Of particular note was a two-goal performance in  a 4–0 drubbing of the Brantford Galaxy.

FF Jaro
On 10 March 2012 it was announced that DeFreitas had signed with FF Jaro of the Finnish top division.

FK Dainava
On 15 March 2013 it was announced that DeFreitas had signed with FK Dainava Alytus playing in the Lithuanian top division. After five matches, DeFreitas left the club in August 2013 because of a breach in his contract by the club of unpaid salaries to the player.

International
DeFreitas has long been involved with the Trinidad and Tobago national youth teams. He was selected on the final squad for the under-17 National team. In addition, he was invited to train with the under-20, under-21 and under-23 teams but unfortunately did not secure a spot on any of the final team rosters. In 2006, he also trained with a large pool of hopeful Trinidadians at the Blackbaud Stadium, who were all vying for a spot on the Trinidad and Tobago senior national team before the 2006 World Cup.

Honours

Individual
Atlantic Sun Conference All-Freshman Team: 2007
Atlantic Sun Conference Second All-Star Team: 2007
Atlantic Sun Conference Freshman of the Year: 2007
Atlantic Coast Conference All-Star Team: 2008
Canadian Soccer League Rookie of the Year: 2011

References

1986 births
Living people
People from Port of Spain
Association football forwards
Association football midfielders
Trinidad and Tobago footballers
Trinidad and Tobago youth international footballers
Trinidad and Tobago under-20 international footballers
North Florida Ospreys men's soccer players
NC State Wolfpack men's soccer players
Orlando City U-23 players
FF Jaro players
FK Dainava Alytus players
Central F.C. players
Kingston FC players
Kokkolan Palloveikot players
FC Jazz players
Kultsu FC players
Ungmennafélagið Sindri players
Vestri (football club) players
Íþróttafélagið Völsungur players
Reynir Sandgerði men's football players
USL League Two players
Veikkausliiga players
TT Pro League players
Canadian Soccer League (1998–present) players
Trinidad and Tobago expatriate footballers
Expatriate soccer players in the United States
Trinidad and Tobago expatriate sportspeople in the United States
Expatriate soccer players in Canada
Trinidad and Tobago expatriate sportspeople in Canada
Expatriate footballers in Finland
Trinidad and Tobago expatriate sportspeople in Finland
Expatriate footballers in Lithuania
Trinidad and Tobago expatriate sportspeople in Lithuania
Expatriate footballers in Iceland
Trinidad and Tobago expatriates in Iceland